This is a list of devices that run on the Android operating system.

A

B

C

D

E

F

G

H

I

J

K

L

M

N

O

P

Q

R

S

T

TW102

U

V

X

Y

Z

See also 

 List of Android TV devices
 List of Android tablets

References 

 
Technology-related lists